Brain for Breakfast is the second studio album of the Italy-based musician, Tying Tiffany.

Track listing
 "Chinga" - 1:53
 "Not a Shame" - 2:41
 "I Can Do It" - 4:18
 "Download Me" - 3:18 (feat. Wolfgang Schrodl)
 "I'd Rather Bet on Outsiders" - 3:35
 "Satellite" - 3:53
 "I Wanna Be Your MP3" - 2:10
 "Unstoppable Spanker" - 3:40 (feat. Santo Niente)
 "Pazza" - 2:57
 "Slow Motion [Nic Endo Remix]" - 4:20
 "Shake a Snake" - 2:19
 "Hollywood Hook" - 3:30
 "Easy Life" - 2:24
 "State of Mind" - 5:19 (feat. Pete Namlook)

References

Tying Tiffany albums
2007 albums